Associazione Calcistica Castellana Calcio is an Italian association football club located in Castel Goffredo, Lombardy. It currently plays in Serie D.

History 
The club was founded in 1973.

In the season 2004–05 the club was promoted from Eccellenza Lombardy to Serie D.

Colors and badge 
Its colours are white and blue. The team away plays in the orange jersey with white shorts.

The symbol of Castellana consists of a shield with the company colours within which is placed the coat of arms of the local municipality.

Stadium 
The club plays its home matches at "Stadio Comunale" of Castel Goffredo, located in via Svezia. The plant, with a single grandstand, has 1500 seats. The budding fund measures 65 metres wide and 105 in length.

References

External links 
Official homepage

Football clubs in Italy
Football clubs in Lombardy
Association football clubs established in 1973
1973 establishments in Italy